is a station in the Tokyo Sakura Tram. It is located in Kita, Tokyo. The section between here and Oji-ekimae Station is shared with other vehicles with it being on Meiji-dōri Street.

Lines 
Asukayama Station is served by the Tokyo Sakura Tram.

Surroundings 
 Asukayama Park

Railway stations in Tokyo